Richard Anthony Scolyer  is an Australian pathologist. He is a senior staff specialist in tissue pathology and diagnostic oncology at Royal Prince Alfred Hospital, co-medical director at the Melanoma Institute Australia, and Cojoint professor at the University of Sydney.

Career
Scolyer provides a clinical consultation service for the diagnosis of difficult pigmented lesions and receives more than 2000 cases for opinion from Australasia and beyond annually. Richard effectively integrates his clinical practice with co-leading a translational melanoma research laboratory.

In February 2019, he was ranked the world's 10th leading publisher on the topic of melanoma and the world's leading publisher in melanoma pathology. Scolyer has co-authored more than 700 publications and book-chapters on the subject, and was an editor of the 4th Edition of the WHO Classification of Tumours.

Awards and recognition
Scolyer received the New South Wales Premier's Award for Outstanding Cancer Research in 2009, 2012, 2013, 2014, 2016, 2017, 2018 and 2020.

He was appointed an Officer of the Order of Australia for "distinguished service to medicine, particularly in the field of melanoma and skin cancer, and to national and international professional organisations" in the 2021 Queen's Birthday Honours.

References

Living people
Year of birth missing (living people)
Officers of the Order of Australia
Australian pathologists
Academic staff of the University of Sydney